Tom Roebuck (born 7 January 2001) is an English rugby union player who plays for Sale Sharks in Premiership Rugby.

Early life 
Roebuck was born in Inverness, Scotland. He attended Christleton High School before moving on to Wirral Grammar. He played youth rugby at Chester RUFC.

While at Wirral he played in the 2018 U18 Vase Final at Twickenham stadium. They were defeated by Langley School 48–22, although Roebuck did score a try in his side's defeat.

Club career 
As part of Sale Sharks' Under-18 squad Roebuck played in their undefeated tour of Ireland in 2017, beating both Munster and Leinster development sides.

Roebuck made his debut as a senior Sale Sharks player in the opening match of the inaugural Premiership Rugby Cup on the 26 October 2018, a 35–3 defeat to Worcester Warriors. He signed his first senior contract with Sale in November 2018.

He made a handful of appearances for the first team in the 2019–20 season and scored his first senior try for the club in a 17-36 Premiership Rugby Cup victory over Saracens. 

Roebuck made 5 Premiership appearances in the 2020–21 season, starting on the wing in 3 matches.

He began to appear for the first team with a much greater regularity during the 2021–22 season under Sale's new DOR Alex Sanderson. During this run of appearances he scored his first try in the European Rugby Champions Cup in a 25–19 defeat to ASM Clermont. Roebuck went on to score a brace of tries in the following match against the Ospreys, securing a 49–10 victory for Sale. Roebuck again scored in the away leg of the Round of 16 against Bristol Bears. Sale would then fall in the quarter finals to Racing 92.

Roebuck scored his first try in Premiership Rugby during Sale's 35–26 win over the league leaders Leicester Tigers, and followed this up by scoring two tries in the next round against Harlequins which ensured a 14–36 victory for Sale at the Stoop. Roebuck started regularly for the club for the remainder of the season and scored a try in Sale's final game against Bristol in a 42-19 win. Sale finished 6th and qualified for the 2022-23 Champions Cup.

International career 
Roebuck was first called up for an England age grade training camp in September 2017, at the age of 16. He was subsequently called up to an England Under-17 training camp in February 2018.

In May 2018 Roebuck was called up to the Great Britain Under-18 7s squad for the Youth Olympic Games qualifiers held in Panevezys, Lithuania. They were defeated by Germany in the quarter-finals and eventually finished fifth, failing to progress to the Youth Olympic Games.

Roebuck was first called up to the England Under 18 squad in July 2018 for the Aon U18 International Series in South Africa. He featured in all 3 of England's matches during the tournament: a 41–21 loss to France Under-18, a 26–20 loss to Wales Under-18 and a 41–22 loss to South Africa Schools. Roebuck scored two tries in the match against South Africa Schools.

Roebuck was next named in the England Under 18 squad for fixtures against Scotland and France in March 2019. He scored two tries in England's 36–21 win over Scotland.

England Under-18 coach Jim Mallinder named Roebuck as part of his squad for the 2019 U18 Six Nations Festival. Roebuck started on the wing for England's 38–20 win over Wales, while he was not selected for England's win over Ireland or their loss to France.

Roebuck was named as part of an England Under-20 training camp in November 2019. He went on be named as part of England's Elite Player Squad for the 2020 Under-20 Six Nations in January 2020.  Roebuck started all 4 of England games which were played before the tournament was ended early by the effects of the COVID-19 Pandemic, scoring a try.

He was then selected for a friendly against a London Irish XV in March 2021 and for a friendly against a Newcastle Falcons XV two weeks later. Alan Dickens, England Under-20 head coach then named Roebuck as part of the squad for the 2021 Under-20 Six Nations Championship. Roebuck made his first appearance off the bench in England's 15–24 victory over Ireland in the 3rd round of the competition.  He then started England's wins over Wales and Italy as they secured their grand slam.

He was called up to the senior England squad for a training camp in October 2022.

References 

2001 births
Living people
Sale Sharks players
English rugby union players
Rugby union centres
Rugby union players from Inverness